Hélder Lopes can refer to:

 Hélder Lopes (politician) - East Timorese politician
 Hélder Lopes (footballer) - Portuguese football player
 Hélder Lopes (tennis) - Portuguese tennis player